The Great Depression in Washington State Project is a multimedia web resource based at the University of Washington in Seattle. Created in the context of renewed economic hard times in 2009, the Project includes essays, maps, digitized newspaper articles and hundreds of rare photographs from the 1930s.  In addition to rapid industrialization and demographic change, the Depression ended decades of Republican rule, created a powerful labor movement, changed the face of the Democratic Party and molded new set of political priorities. In several thematic sections, the Project examines these changes in everyday life, culture, politics and work. The Project is one of the Pacific Northwest Labor and Civil Rights History Projects, characterized by student-led research and public scholarship.

Content
The site is divided into sections on Economics and Poverty, Strikes and Unions, Radicalism, Civil Rights, the University of Washington, Politics, Culture and Arts, Everyday Life and New Deal Public Works. Each includes historical photographs, research reports, maps and other unique materials. In addition, the Project contains a special section on Theater Arts and the Federal Theater Project in Washington. Other aspects of the site include a full timeline of major events in the state during the Depression, Seattle Hoovervilles, interactive maps of New Deal public works projects, famed photographer Dorothea Lange's work in the Yakima Valley and a day-by-day database of digitized newspaper articles on labor issues covering 1930 to 1938. The unveiling of the site was accompanied by the production of the Depression-era plays Waiting for Lefty and End of Summer at the Jones Playhouse in Seattle in February 2010.

References

External links

Pacific Northwest Labor and Civil Rights History Projects
Strikes! Labor History Encyclopedia for the Pacific Northwest

Civilian Conservation Corps in Washington (state)
Digital history projects
Digital humanities projects
Economic history of the United States
Economy of Seattle
Economy of Washington (state)
Government of Washington (state)
Great Depression in the United States
History of Washington (state)
History of labor relations in the United States
New Deal in Washington (state)
Politics of Washington (state)
Social history of the United States
University of Washington projects
Works Progress Administration in Washington (state)